The 385th Bombardment Squadron was a United States Army Air Forces unit active during World War II.  After training in the United States, it deployed to the China-Burma-India Theater, but was disbanded shortly after arriving in India.  The 785th Tactical Fighter Squadron was activated along with the 32nd Tactical Fighter Wing at George Air Force Base, California in April 1964.  However, in July 1964, the 8th Tactical Fighter Wing replaced the 32d Wing and the 785th transferred its personnel and equipment to another squadron.  The two squadrons were consolidated in 1985 as the 785th Tactical Air Support Training Squadron, but the consolidated squadron has not been active.

History
The 385th Bombardment Squadron was activated at Will Rogers Field, Oklahoma as one of the four original squadrons of the 311th Bombardment Group and began to train with Vultee V-72.  In July, the group moved to Waycross Army Air Field.  Shortly after its arrival, it was redesignated as a dive bomber squadron, along with other Army Air Forces (AAF) single engine bomber units.  1943 saw an upgrade to North American A-36 Apaches.  The squadron completed its training and departed the United States for the China-Burma-India Theater in July 1943.

The squadron arrived in India in September, after a brief pause in Australia.  However, the AAF was again reorganizing its dive bomber groups as fighter bomber units.  Fighter bomber groups, however, were made up of three, rather than four squadrons.  As a result, the 385th was disbanded on 30 September 1943 before it could fly any combat missions.

The 785th Tactical Fighter Squadron was activated with the 32nd Tactical Fighter Wing at George Air Force Base, California in April 1964.  It soon began to train with the McDonnell F-4 Phantom II.  However, the 8th Tactical Fighter Wing, which was drawing down in Japan moved on paper to George in July and replaced the 32nd Wing.  As a result, the 785th was inactivated and its assets were transferred to the 497th Tactical Fighter Squadron.

The 385th Bombardment Squadron was consolidated with the 785th Tactical Fighter Squadron as the 785th Tactical Air Support Training Squadron on 19 September 1985.

Lineage
 385th Bombardment Squadron
 Constituted as the 385th Bombardment Squadron (Light) on 28 January 1942
 Activated on 2 March 1942
 Redesignated 385th Bombardment Squadron (Dive) on 27 July 1942
 Disbanded on 30 September 1943
 Consolidated with the 785th Tactical Fighter Squadron as the 785th Tactical Air Support Training Squadron on 19 September 1985

 785th Tactical Fighter Squadron
 Constituted as the 785th Tactical Fighter Squadron and activated on 6 April 1964
 Organized on 1 April 1964
 Discontinued and inactivated on 25 July 1964
 Consolidated with the 385th Bombardment Squadron as the 785th Tactical Air Support Training Squadron on 19 September 1985

Assignments
 311th Bombardment Group, 2 March 1942 – 30 September 1943
 32nd Tactical Fighter Wing, 1 April 1964 – 25 July 1964

Stations
 Will Rogers Field, Oklahoma, 2 March 1942
 Hunter Field, Georgia, 4 July 1942
 Waycross Army Air Field, Georgia, 22 October 1942 – 18 July 1943
 Nawadih Airfield, India, c. 17–30 September 1943
 George Air Force Base, California, 1 April 1964 – 25 July 1964

Aircraft
 Vultee V-72, 1942
 North American A-36 Apache, 1943
 McDonnell F-4 Phantom II, 1964

Campaigns

References

Notes
 Explanatory notes

 Citations

Bibliography

 
 
 
 

Military units and formations established in 1942
Military units and formations disestablished in 1943
Bombardment squadrons of the United States Army Air Forces